Tzini is a neighbourhood in the central part of the city of Patras.  It is named after the Tzini (Τζίνη) family which is descended from Epirus.  In 1828, Theodoros Tzinis moved to Patras and in 1831 built a house in which it still exist today by the side of Maizonos and Agiou Nikolaou Streets.  It bought large properties in the northwestern part of Patras not far from Dasyllio.

References
The first version of the article is translated and is based from the article at the Greek Wikipedia (el:Main Page)

Neighborhoods in Patras